The Diploma in Teaching in the Lifelong Learning Sector (DTLLS) was an initial teacher training qualification, studied at QCF Level 5 or 7, for teaching in Further Education (FE) and the lifelong learning sector of education in the United Kingdom. The DTLLS was the highest of the teaching qualifications specifically for this sector of education, the others being the Certificate in Teaching in the Lifelong Learning Sector (CTLLS) and the Preparing to Teach in the Lifelong Learning Sector (PTLLS) qualifications. The DTLLS at QCF Level 7 was equivalent to a Post-Graduate Certificate in Education in Lifelong Learning or Post-Compulsory Education and Training (PCET). The DTLLS was phased out along with the CTLLS and the PTLLS, and replaced with the Diploma in Education and Training qualification at QCF Level 5.

References 

Educational qualifications in the United Kingdom
Teacher training